Carol Montag is an American folk singer-songwriter, who was born in Ames, Iowa, United States.  Referred to by Tom Paxton as "the best to come out of Iowa since Bonnie Koloc", she has opened on several occasions for Arlo Guthrie.  She is also one third of the Cedar Rapids, Iowa-based Christmas-themed trio Tribute, with Nina Swanson and Kathy Donnelly which performs yearly during the season.

Discography
Song for Carrie, 1985, Salek Street Records
White, 1987, Salek Street Records
Marigolds, 2000, Monday's Music

References

External links
Official website
Tribute website

Year of birth missing (living people)
Living people
American women singer-songwriters
People from Ames, Iowa
21st-century American women
Singer-songwriters from Iowa